Synaphe testacealis is a species of moth of the family Pyralidae. It was described by Walter Rothschild in 1915. It is found in Algeria.

References

Moths described in 1915
Pyralini
Endemic fauna of Algeria
Moths of Africa